Sylvie Le Bon-de Beauvoir is the adopted daughter of Simone de Beauvoir. She is a philosophy professor.  The meeting between the two women was recounted in the book Tout compte fait, which Simone de Beauvoir dedicated to Le Bon.

Le Bon was one of the women that de Beauvoir and Jean-Paul Sartre cared and provided for. Sylvie Le Bon and Simone de Beauvoir met in 1960, when Le Bon was 17 and de Beauvoir was 52. 

De Beauvoir legally adopted Le Bon in 1980, making her the sole executor of her will.

After the death of Simone de Beauvoir in 1986, Sylvie Le Bon-de Beauvoir published several volumes of letters:

Lettres à Sartre - an anthology of the letters between Simone de Beauvoir and Sartre
Lettres à Nelson Algren
Correspondance croisée (Simone de Beauvoir and Jacques-Laurent Bost)
Anne, ou quand prime le spirituel (republication of Simone's first novel)

References

Contributeurs à Wikipedia, "Sylvie Le Bon de Beauvoir," Wikipedia, http://fr.wikipedia.org/w/index.php?title=Sylvie_Le_Bon_de_Beauvoir&oldid=37383641 (Page consultée le janvier 25, 2009).

French philosophers
Living people
Simone de Beauvoir
Year of birth missing (living people)
French women philosophers
20th-century French women writers
20th-century French writers
Women anthologists